Salinicoccus jeotgali is a bacterium, first isolated from jeotgal, hence its name. It is moderately halophilic, Gram-positive and coccus-shaped, designated strain S2R53-5T (=KCTC 13030T =LMG 23640T).

References

Further reading
 Horikoshi, Koki, ed. Extremophiles Handbook:... Vol. 1. Springer, 2011.
 Jefferson, K., and Vance Fowler. Staphylococci in human disease. Ed. Gordon Archer. West Sussex, UK: Wiley-Blackwell, 2009.

External links
 LPSN
 Type strain of Salinicoccus jeotgali at BacDive -  the Bacterial Diversity Metadatabase

Staphylococcaceae
Bacteria described in 2007